{{Infobox television
| image                = 
| caption              =
| genre                = Romance-drama-detective
| camera               =
| picture_format       =
| audio_format         =
| runtime              = 60 minutes.
| creator              = Salah Karam
| developer            =
| producer             = TV Iraq, the official
| executive_producer   = Wajeeh Abdul-Ghani
| presenter            = TV Iraq, the officialWarka of the television production
| starring             = 
| voices               =
| narrated             =
|composer = Jaafar Al-Khaffaf; and the playing band Ra'ad George
| opentheme            = "Shjaha Al-nnas Theme," Sing by Kazem El Saher
| endtheme             = "Nadia," composed by Jaafar Al-Khaffaf
| country              = Iraq
| location             = Baghdad
| language             = Arabic
| num_seasons          = 1
| num_episodes         = 24
| list_episodes        = 
| network              = TV Iraq, the official
| first_aired          = 
| last_aired           = 
}}Nadia'' is an Iraqi TV series, consisting of eighteen episodes, directed by Salah Karam and starring Iraqi actors Hassan Hosni and Amel Senan. Adel (Hosni) falls deeply in love with a girl he meets - he learns she is prone to sudden and mystifying disappearances, seemingly at random. Adding to Adel's growing confusion, everyone around him, including his family and closest friends, steadfastly deny the very existence of any such girl in his life, insisting, sometimes forcefully, that she is a mere figment of his infatuation, a projection by his damaged psyche of the idealized woman. Following the events of the series and the revelation of a complex conspiracy, seemingly organized by the owner of the hotel where the conspirators meet and plot (played by Iraqi artist Wajeeh Abdul-Ghani), Adel's 'idealized projection' reveals her name to be 'Nadia'.

Overview 
Nadia is an Iraqi drama series consisting of twenty-four episodes, directed by Salah Karam and starring by Hassan Hosni and Amel Senan, is about a man named Adel (played by the Iraqi Actor Hassan Hosni) who fall in love with girl that suddenly disappear and claims her name is Nadia (in turn represented Amel Senan ). Not only this, but strangely enough,  everyone around him denies the existence of such a girl, it turns out  the hotel owner orchestrated the whole thing, the role is played by artist Wajeeh Abdul-Ghani and, we later discovered this girl and she had to do that because she was being blackmailed by others, and she had no other choice but to do that. We also learned that Nadia was not her real name!

Cast

Main 
 Hassan Hosni as Adel
 Amel Senan as Nadia

Supporting 
 Wajeeh Abdul-Ghani
 Sami Kaftan
 Sana Abdul Rahman
 Zaher Al-Fahid
 Hadeel Kamel
 Wajdi al-Ani
 Ibtisam Farid
 Aziz Khyoun
 Bahjat Al- Jubouri
 Iqbal Naeem
 Amera Jawad
 Saadia al-Zaidi
 Shehab Ahmed
 Sami El Sarraj
 Taha Salem
 Meqdad Muslim
 Iltfat Aziz
 Azzedine Tabou
 Subhi Qasem
 Leila Georgis
 Ahlam Arab
 Taleb Al-Rifai
 Ferial Karim
 Qahtan Zughayyar
 Mutashar Al-Sudani
 Magda El-Saadi
 Azhar Al-Fourati
 Redha Nidham
 Walid al-Obeidi
 Jabbar Hasan
 Ali Ihsan Al-Jarrah
 Subhi Sabri
 Hassan fashil
 Essam Abdel-Rahman
 Hikmat Al- Qaisi
 Karem Jallob
 Salam al-Samarrai

Supporting – children 
 Ahmed Mohammed
 Nada Taha Salim
 Hamlet Sabah
 Hamdi Saleh
 Ammar Fadhel
 Salah Zaid

Production 
Produced a series of Baghdad in 1987 and displayed in the TV Iraq, the official in late 1988 and was the first appearance of the heroine of the series Amel Senan won the award for Best Actress in Iraq for the year 1988 due to its performance for the title role in this series, but did not continue representation in terms migrated Iraq early nineties after the death of her father, the media Iraqi Turkmen Dr. Senan Sae'ed, although it has the title role (the role of the doctor) also in the film comedy Iraq six on six (6 / 6) in the same year (1988), which Directed by Iraqi Khaeria Mansour, starred with Qasim Al-Mallak, Laila Mohammed and others, and in the following information on this series,

• Lyrics submitted by: voice of Kazem El Saher is one of the words and composed by Karem Al-Iraqi & Jaafar Al-Jaffaf and the playing band Ra'ad George
• Be a series of thirty episodes
• Written by Ma'ath Joseph
• Directed by Salah Karam
• Production in 1987
• View in TV Iraq, the official in 1988

Crew 
 Make-up: Yusuf Salman
 Assistant directing: Akram Kamil and Najim Ali Jadoua
 Executive Producer: Wajeeh Abdul-Ghani
 Output port: Taleb Al-Rifai
 Distribution: Warka of the television production
 Written by: Ma'ath Joseph
 Director: Salah Karam

Influence 
Famous for the series, much of it in TV Iraq, the official in 1988 since the broadcast of the first episode it has attracted the attention and follow-up to the Iraqis to him and not miss it for several reasons, including introduction, singing beautiful "Introduction beautiful lyrics" (song: shjaha Al-nnas) (What Happened to People) voice of Kazem El Saher (in his beginning of career), one of the words Karim Al-Iraqi and composed by Jaafar Al-Khaffaf and the playing band Ra'ad George. And the story of the series interesting marked by many puzzles that made the viewer sympathize with the Star of the series just (Hassan Hosni) in addition to the performance of some of the stars of representation in Iraq, including the first appearance and strong artist Amel Senan Star of the series, as passed by us, and share the tournament director and actor known Iraqi Hassan Hosni and everything miniseries make it work competently and still firmly in the memory of the viewer Iraq despite the passage of about 30 years on display for the first time.

Awards

References
From Arabic pages that some have been google translated

External links
 first women
 http://wwwallafblogspotcom.blogspot.com/2010/06/blog-post_9477.html
 Iraqi cinema ... a beautiful past with an eye on present ruin
 http://www.mocul.gov.iq/arabic/index.php?name=Pages&op=showcat&cid=85
 http://www.ahewar.org/debat/show.art.asp?aid=236395
 https://www.youtube.com/watch?v=7CgQwOkJZ5U&NR=1
 https://www.youtube.com/watch?v=9DAVNQhqMFg
 https://web.archive.org/web/20111113060843/http://kalema.a7larab.net/t26808-topic

1988 Iraqi television series debuts
Iraqi drama television series
1980s Iraqi television series